Juan Carlos Murúa is a former Argentine football player and manager who played in the Copa América 1959.

Murúa was primarily associated with the Greater Buenos Aires team Racing Club de Avellaneda, where he was part of the championship winning team of 1958. He went on to play for Argentinos Juniors and Platense.

Coaching career
After retiring as a player Murúa took up coaching, he had spells in charge of several Buenos Aires based teams, such as Gimnasia La Plata, Platense and Talleres de Remedios de Escalada where he led the team to a third tier championship and gave José Yudica his first break in management.

Later in his career he coached several teams in the interior including Altos Hornos Zapla during the 1983 and 1985 Nacional championships.

Following his professional career, Murúa has remained one of the best-remembered stars of his era, with his 1958 image appearing, for example, on a 2005 El Grafico trading card, and is a representative of Argentine soccer at national events. As of 2007, he is affiliated with the college team U. Veronés.

References

External links
 Clarin article 
 Clarin article 2011-feb-04 

Living people
Argentine footballers
Argentina international footballers
Argentine Primera División players
Racing Club de Avellaneda footballers
Argentinos Juniors footballers
Club Atlético Platense footballers
Talleres de Remedios de Escalada footballers
Argentine football managers
Club Atlético Los Andes managers
Club de Gimnasia y Esgrima La Plata managers
Independiente Rivadavia managers
Club Atlético Platense managers
Talleres de Remedios de Escalada managers
Association football defenders
Year of birth missing (living people)